John de Moray (died c. 1322), Lord of Drumsagard, was a Scottish noble.

He was the eldest son of William de Moray of Drumsagard. He obtained the lands of Abercairney, Aberrochil, Rossiechill, Eggie and Egglesmachan upon his second marriage.

Marriages and issue
From his first marriage, he is known to have had the following issue:
unknown de Moray, killed during a fight with Godfrey Ross, Sheriff of Ayr and Lanark.
Maurice de Moray, married Johanna, Countess of Strathearn, had issue.

John married secondly Mary, daughter to Malise, Earl of Strathearn, they are known to have had the following issue:
Alexander de Moray of Ogilvy and Abercairny
Walter de Moray of Glasswell

References
Paul, James Balfour. The Scots Peerage : Founded On Wood's ed. of Sir Robert Douglas's Peerage of Scotland; Containing An Historical And Genealogical Account of The Nobility of That Kingdom. Edinburgh: Douglas (1904) Moray, Earl of Strathearn, Vol VIII, pps 255–8.

13th-century Scottish people
14th-century Scottish people
Moray
De Moravia family
Clan Murray
Scottish people of French descent
People of Flemish descent